Herbert Ernest Brocklesbury (27 June 1879 – 9 March 1959) was an English professional footballer who played as a full-back.

References

1879 births
1959 deaths
Footballers from Grimsby
English footballers
Association football fullbacks
Grimsby White Star F.C. players
St James United F.C. players
Grimsby Town F.C. players
Grimsby All Saints F.C. players
English Football League players